Bacula lamberti is a species of sea snail, a marine gastropod mollusk in the family Eulimidae. The species is one of three known species to exist within the genus Bacula, the other two being Bacula morisyuichiroi and Bacula striolata.

References

External links
 To World Register of Marine Species

Eulimidae
Gastropods described in 1875